Françoise Ega (11 November 1920 – 8 March 1976) was an Afro-Martinican laborer, writer and social activist. She was most noted in her lifetime for her community leadership and advocacy for Caribbean migrants to France. Since her death, her written works, which explore themes of alienation, exploitation, and nationalism, have been recognized as an important voice for French Antillean women in the period between the end of the Second World War and the end to colonization.

Early life
Françoise Marcelle Modock was born on 11 November 1920 in Le Morne-Rouge, Martinique to the seamstress Déhé Partel and gamekeeper, Claude Modock. Modock was raised in Martinique and took a secretarial course, earning a typing diploma before she moved to France during World War II. There she met and married Franz Ega on 8 May 1946 in Paris. Her husband was a soldier, which led the couple to live in several African countries before they settled in Marseille, where four of her five children were born.

Career
Ega was very involved in the Caribbean community in Marseille. She founded after-school programs for children and tutored children in both school studies and Catholic catechism. She was an organizer of the French West Indian-Guianese soccer team and founded two organizations the Association of Antillean and Guianese Workers and the Antillo-Guianese Cultural and Sports Association to foster participation by migrants from the French Antilles and French Guiana in sporting and cultural events. As an educated woman, Ega also helped migrants with paperwork and transactions related to carrying out their day-to-day activities, as well as giving adult literacy lessons. Active in politics and union activities, she strongly advocated for the protection of public spaces, such as parks, swimming pools and stadiums. She worked with Séverin Montarello to create the Espace Culturel Busserine, the first neighborhood center in the area.

In the 1960s, Ega produced two autobiographical novels, Le temps des Madras (1966) and Lettres à une noire, which was not published until after her death in 1978. The first, was a series of poems, which recalled Ega's childhood experiences in Martinique. In Lettres à une noire, she explored themes that were common to many Caribbean migrants in the post-war period: alienation, exploitation, migration, nationalism, as well as classism, racism and gender. After hearing tales of women migrants of their difficulties as domestics, Ega took a position as a housekeeper to be able to write about the experience. Thus, in Lettres, she describes herself as a woman, negro, housekeeper, in that order, to show that she has no authority, no rights, and is nameless. The novel relays the treatment which black domestics endured, a world where their labor was important, but they were not. Where workers were expected to silently carry out tasks ignoring their own need for food or relief, as if the work were done not by humans, but by nameless objects.

The book is organized as a series of journal entries (or never posted letters) to the Brazilian writer Carolina Maria de Jesus, whom Ega got to know reading the Paris Match Magazine.

 Her works, along with a few other contemporary Caribbean writers, critique the French efforts to manage their colonies in the postwar period. Ega spoke of the stratified society, the low wages migrants were paid, the lack of education.

Death and legacy
Ega died on 8 March 1976 in Marseille. After her death, a plaque was installed to commemorate her works at the Busserine Cultural Centre and a committee was established to maintain her legacy of community service. The committee has also continued to publish posthumous works. In 1978, they released Lettres à une noire; in 1992 Le pin de Magneu was published; and in 2000, the Mam’Ega Committee published L’Alizé ne soufflait plus, which explores a young Martinican couple's experiences in France at the end of the war.

References

Citations

Bibliography

 

1920 births
1976 deaths
Martiniquais people
Caribbean people of African descent
French women activists
French activists
20th-century French women writers